Waxholme is a hamlet in the East Riding of Yorkshire, England.

It forms part of the civil parish of Rimswell.

Etymology
Waxholme means "village where wax (from bees) is produced. The first element of the name is Old English weax "wax".

Despite the place-name ending in "-holme" (which is normally from Old Norse holmr "island, water-meadow"), it is not from this word. Instead the ending is Old English ham "homestead", rather than the similar Old English hamm "river-meadow, bend in river", despite the village's proximity to the River Humber. The name was recorded as Wexnem in 1162.

In 1823 inhabitants in the village numbered 72. Occupations included seven farmers.

References

External links

Villages in the East Riding of Yorkshire
Holderness